MSC Prestige is a container ship (IMO 9321029) that collided with a large tanker MV Samco Europe, off the Red Sea traffic separation scheme of Bab-el-Mandeb on 7 December 2007. Both vessels suffered severe damage at their bows and had to undergo major repairs.

An official report was compiled.

The vessel was subsequently renamed back to MOL Prestige.

Type of ship : Cellular Container               
IMO Number: 	9321029 	
Flag: 	 Panama
MMSI Number: 	351861000 	                
Length: 	292.0m          
Beam: 	40.0m
Callsign: 	3EGH8

References

External links

Container ships
Maritime incidents in 2007
2006 ships